Bror Sture Ragnvald Grahn (born 24 May 1932) is a retired Swedish cross-country skier. He finished tenth in the 50 km event at the 1956 Winter Olympics and won gold medals in the 4 × 10 km relay at the 1958 and 1962 World Championships. His wife Barbro Martinsson also competed in cross-country skiing at the 1956 Olympics.

Cross-country skiing results

Olympic Games

World Championships
 2 medals – (2 gold)

References

External links

1932 births
Living people
Swedish male cross-country skiers
Cross-country skiers at the 1956 Winter Olympics
FIS Nordic World Ski Championships medalists in cross-country skiing